Trekker may refer to:

 Trekker (comics), a comic book series
 Trekkie or Trekker, a fan of Star Trek
 Trekker, a person who goes Backpacking
 Toyota Trekker, Japanese SUV
 VW Trekker, German convertible

See also
 Trek (disambiguation)
 Trekboer